The Court of Criminal Appeal of Northern Ireland was established on the model of the English Court by the Criminal Appeal (Northern Ireland) Act 1930. It was replaced by a general Court of Appeal by the Judicature (Northern Ireland) Act 1978.

References 

Courts of Northern Ireland
Appellate courts
Former courts and tribunals in the United Kingdom
1930 establishments in Northern Ireland
1978 disestablishments in Northern Ireland
Courts and tribunals established in 1930
Courts and tribunals disestablished in 1978